Interstate 88 (I-88) is an Interstate Highway in the US state of Illinois that runs from an interchange with I-80 near Silvis and Moline to an interchange with I-290 and I-294 in Hillside, near Chicago. This route is not contiguous with I-88 in New York. Since 2010, most of I-88 has been part of the Chicago–Kansas City Expressway. The highway also runs through the cities of Aurora, Naperville, DeKalb, and Dixon. East of Rock Falls, the route is a part of the Illinois Tollway system.

Route description

East Moline to Yeoward Addition
Starting at I-80 at a cloverleaf interchange, IL 5 ends there while IL 92 continues eastward. I-88 begins at that interchange and then traverses eastward. Immediately east of the cloverleaf, I-88, IL 92, and IL 110 meet a road at a diamond interchange. This road used to be part of IL 2 and IL 92. They then traverse eastward until IL 92 branches off east near Joslin. The freeway then meets the next two local roads, each having a diamond interchange. One of the interchanges serves Hillsdale while the other one serves Erie. The two routes then meet IL 78 near Lyndon. Near Como, they then meet US 30 at a trumpet interchange. South of Rock Falls, they then meet IL 40 at a diamond interchange. East of Yeoward Addition, they again meet US Route 30 (US 30) at a diamond interchange.

Yeoward Addition to Aurora
At this point, a freeway becomes a tollway for the rest of I-88. However, at the IL 26 interchange, there are no tolls present on each ramp. Beyond that, the tollway crosses under US 52 without direct access. Then, the two routes meet their first mainline toll plaza. Further east, they then meet IL 251 (at a diamond interchange) and I-39/US 51 (at a cloverleaf interchange) at Rochelle. From then on, they meet another mainline toll plaza. In DeKalb, they then meet Annie Glidden Road at a trumpet interchange, then crossing over IL 23 without direct access meeting an oasis (a rest area) and Peace Road at a four-ramp parclo. South of Nottingham Woods, they meet IL 47 at a five-ramp parclo with two ramps requiring I-Pass. Further east, they then meet IL 56 at a partial interchange. At this point, IL 56 follows the two routes. They then meet Orchard Road at a four-ramp parclo. Then, IL 56 leaves the freeway at the IL 31 interchange.

Aurora to Hillside
Across the Fox River, I-88 and IL 110 meet another toll plaza. Then, they meet Farnsworth Avenue at a six-ramp parclo near the Chicago Premium Outlets. From then on, they meet Eola Road indirectly, IL 59 at a diverging diamond interchange, Winfield Road at a diamond interchange, Naperville Road at a mix of partial interchanges, and IL 53 at an incomplete parclo. Beyond that, they meet I-355 at a mix of interchanges. At Highland Avenue interchange, all but the westbound onramp are present. The other one enters I-88 westbound from Downers Drive. After that, the eastbound tollway meets another mainline toll plaza. After that, I-88 and IL 110 then meet Midwest Road at a two-ramp incomplete parclo (no westbound on/offramp). Then, they meet IL 83 at a three-ramp incomplete parclo, 22nd Street at a right-in/right-out (no eastbound on/offramp), another mainline toll plaza for westbound traffic, and I-294/IL 38. Beyond I-294/IL 38, I-88 briefly leaves the tollway before ending at I-290. At that point, IL 110 continues eastward via I-290.

History

Prior to its designation as an Interstate Highway, the route was known as IL 5 and, before that, IL 190.

In 1975, IL 5 was extended westward to Rock Falls. Back then, only a small portion south of Rock Falls was free. At that point, there were two proposed freeways connecting each individual cities, FAP 402 (a proposed freeway to Clinton, Iowa) and FAP 403 (another proposed freeway to East Moline). However, only FAP 403 was being built. By 1979, IL 5 finished completing the FAP 403 freeway.

The reason for I-88's original designation and continued existence as an Interstate has to do with a technicality in the old National Maximum Speed Law (NMSL). Originally passed in 1973, the NMSL was amended in 1987 to permit  speed limits on rural stretches of Interstate Highways only. Even though IL 5 was fully up to Interstate Highway standards, it still had to carry a  limit because of this wording in NMSL. The Illinois Department of Transportation (IDOT) and Illinois State Toll Highway Authority (ISTHA) petitioned the American Association of State Highway and Transportation Officials (AASHTO) to redesignate IL 5 as an Interstate, and, in 1987, AASHTO approved the request and assigned the I-88 numbering to the highway. The NMSL would be completely repealed only eight years later in 1995, but the I-88 shields remain to this day, even though Chicago–Kansas City Expressway (IL 110) markers are being posted throughout the entire length of I-88, since it is now part of the Chicago to Kansas City Expressway project, bannered with special "CKC" logos.

Ronald Reagan Memorial Tollway

The Ronald Reagan Memorial Tollway, originally known as the East-West Tollway, is a toll road in northern Illinois.

Opened November 21, 1958, it was initially designated as US Route 30 Toll (US 30 Toll), and later IL 190. The original routing extended from the I-294 interchange near Hillside to IL 47 near Sugar Grove. IL 56 was overlapped on the East-West Tollway between North Aurora and Sugar Grove in 1965.

When the East-West Tollway was extended to Dixon in the 1970s, the IL 190 numbering was removed from the stretch between Aurora and Sugar Grove, making that section strictly IL 56. Once complete, the new routing of the combined tollway and freeway between I-80 near the Quad Cities and I-294 became designated as IL 5. In the late 1980s, it was renumbered I-88.

Officially, the tollway portion begins in Rock Falls, starting at the intersection with US 30 at milemarker 44, although the first toll plaza does not appear until after the IL 26 interchange in Dixon, making the section between US 30 and IL 26 technically a freeway. It continues as a tollway until its terminus in Hillside, although there is a free section between exit 76 (IL 251) and exit 78 (I-39). West of US 30 to I-80, I-88 is a freeway.

After the death of Illinois native and former President Ronald Reagan in 2004, ISTHA voted to rename the toll roadway "Ronald Reagan Memorial Tollway" in his memory, as it passes near his birthplace of Tampico and grazes the south outskirts of his boyhood hometown of Dixon. The tollway portion of I-88 was previously known as the "East–West Tollway" and is still displayed as such on some signs near Chicago.

There is no direct off-ramp access to US 52, IL 23, IL 25, and IL 83 (northbound). In addition, I-88 merges with IL 56 for a short distance.

Although a federal law, 23 U.S.C. § 111, prohibits the operation of commercial rest areas constructed after January 1, 1960, on Interstate Highways, the DeKalb oasis was constructed at milepost 93 in 1975, prior to the route's designation as I-88, and remains in operation.

From 2005 lasting through 2012, ISTHA reconstructed and widened much of the original portion of I-88, between York Road and IL 56. Approximately $991.6 million (equivalent to $ in ) was budgeted for I-88 over that period. Between 2005 and 2009, I-88 was reconstructed and widened to four lanes in each direction between IL 59 and York Road, with work progressing gradually from west to east. The project included a reconstruction and reconfiguration of the Naperville Road interchange. Between IL 56 and the Aurora Toll Plaza, I-88 was reconstructed and widened to three lanes in each direction, including the reconstruction of the IL 31 interchange and new bridges over the Fox River.

Exit list

References

External links

Illinois Highway Ends: Interstate 88
Historic, Current & Average Travel Times For The Ronald Reagan Tollway
Illinois Tollway website

88 west
88
088
Expressways in the Chicago area
Transportation in Rock Island County, Illinois
Transportation in Whiteside County, Illinois
Transportation in Lee County, Illinois
Transportation in Ogle County, Illinois
Transportation in DeKalb County, Illinois
Transportation in Kane County, Illinois
Transportation in DuPage County, Illinois
Transportation in Cook County, Illinois